Dar Tang-e Olya (also Romanized as Dar Tang-e ‘Olyā; also known as Darreh Tang-e ‘Olyā, Darreh Tang, Darreh Tang-e Kahmān-e Bālā, Darreh Tang-e Kahmān-e ‘Olyā, Dar Tang-e Kahmān, Dar Tang-i-Kehmān, and Kahmān) is a village in Yusefvand Rural District, in the Central District of Selseleh County, Lorestan Province, Iran. At the 2006 census, its population was 474, in 94 families.

References 

Towns and villages in Selseleh County